A lexical rule is in a form of syntactic rule used within many theories of natural language syntax. These rules alter the argument structures of lexical items (for example verbs and declensions) in order to alter their combinatory properties.

Lexical rules affect in particular specific word classes and morphemes. Moreover, they may have exceptions, do not apply across word boundaries and can only apply to underlying forms. 

An example of a lexical rule in spoken English is the deletion of /n/. This rule applies in damn and autumn, but not in hymnal. Because the rule of n-deletion apparently needs information about the grammatical status of the word, it can only be lexical.  

Lexical rules are the inverse of postlexical rules.

References 

Gussenhoven, C. & Jacobs, H. (1998). Understanding Phonology. Arnold, Londen.

Matthews, P. H. "lexical rule." The Concise Oxford Dictionary of Linguistics. : Oxford University Press, 2014. Oxford Reference. 

Syntactic relationships